RHTM may refer to:
 The Regional Highway Traffic Model a multimillion-pound system developed by the UK's Department of Transport in the 1970s
 Retail, hospitality, and tourism management, a subject offered at degree level by University of Tennessee (Knoxville)
 Recombinant human thrombomodulin (rhTM)